Irumbu Thirai is a 2018 Indian Tamil-language action techno-thriller film directed by debutant P. S. Mithran. The film stars Vishal, Arjun, and Samantha Ruth Prabhu, with Yuvan Shankar Raja composing the soundtrack. The film was produced by Vishal Film Factory, and the venture began production in October 2016. The narrative centers around an army officer, who starts hunting down a gang of hackers after they steal money from his bank account.

The film released worldwide on 11 May 2018  and received positive reviews from critics and audience praising the cast performances(particularly Vishal and Arjun), writing, direction, action sequences and technical aspects. The film successfully completed 100-days at the box office and became the seventh-highest grossing Tamil film of 2018.

Plot 
Indian Army Major Kathiravan is working on anger management issues under chief psychiatrist Rathi Devi aka Rathi in order to return to his job. Soon they both fall in love where she counsels him to leave for his village to spend time with his father Rangaswamy and sister. Though having hated his father due to his habit of borrowing money, Kathiravan reluctantly agrees. Kathiravan finds that his sister's fiancé Kesavan's family demands them to bear the marriage expenses. He realizes his mistake of abandoning his family and promises to fulfill his sister's wish. Kathiravan returns to Chennai to apply for a loan, only to get rejected everywhere. With the advice of his uncle, he takes his father to Chennai along with him and tries to get a loan in Rangaswamy's name and is also rejected everywhere due to financial security. 

They are approached by a person, who claims to be a loan agent and tells them to forge documents to get a loan for a commission. Kathiravan initially refuses, but reluctantly agrees to the man's offer and submits all the original documents to him. Kathiravan is overjoyed and starts the marriage preparation. Later on, when Rangaswamy was unable to withdraw money due to insufficient balance, he informs Kathiravan, who in turn is surprised by the missing fund. Kathiravan enquires the bank, but to no avail. He becomes frustrated and scolds Rangaswamy. Unable to bear the words, Rangaswamy attempts suicide. In the hospital, Kathiravan learns that Rangaswamy took debts to extend Kathiravan's sick mother's life. He feels remorseful after hearing this and reconciles with Rangaswamy. 

On Rathi's advice and with the help of his friends in the military, he decides to the track down the person responsible for the theft. Kathiravan manages to apprehend and chase a loan agent similar to his loan agent in order to extradite information. Later, he gets a phone call from a private number who tells Kathiravan to release him as he knows all the details about him and even threatens to release the private files in his sister's phone on the net. This shocks Kathiravan, who leaves the agent, but the agent is fatally hit by a van. The mysterious person is later revealed to be Sathyamoorthy aka White Devil, who is the kingpin of the Dark Net by the use of the Y2k Problem. He runs an educational trust as a front for his cybercrime network. Kathiravan tracks and confronts Sathyamoorthy where the latter reveals his knowledge of the former following him and tells him that he attacked his sister. 

Sathyamoorthy also tells Kathiravan that he put  to his account from a flagged account for which he is court-martialed. However, Kathiravan tracks Sathyamoorthy's henchmen with Rathi's help and confronts Sathyamoorthy at the server farm, where the two engage in hand-to-hand combat. Sathyamoorthy defeats Kathiravan and burns the money due to his god complex. All the people who were conned by Sathyamoorthy learns about Sathyamoorthy from Kathiravan, and they reach the docks. Kathiravan fights back and defeats Sathyamoorthy, where the people get their money transferred back to their respective accounts. Sathyamoorthy is arrested by the police but creates a new username named Dark Angel hinting a sequel.

Cast 
       
 Vishal as Major Kathiravan Rangarajan
 Arjun as Sathyamoorthy / White Devil / Dark Angel
 Samantha Ruth Prabhu as Dr.Rathi Devi
 Delhi Ganesh as Rangarajan, Kathir's father
 Sreeja Ravi as Kathir's mother 
 Robo Shankar as Kathir's uncle
 Darshana Rajendran as Selvi, Kathir's sister
 Suman as ACP
 Kavithalaya Krishnan as Bank Manager
 Kaali Venkat as Gnanavel Raja
 Vivek Prasanna as Loan Collection Agent
 Vincent Asokan as Minister
 Madhusudhan Rao as Stephen Raj, a corrupt police officer
 G. Marimuthu as ashram owner 
 Mahanadi Shankar as a money lender
 Rahul Thatha as an old man in Kathir's village
 Abdul as Loan Agent
 Sathya NJ as Hacker
 Pradeep K Vijayan as Sivakumar
 Kothandam as a hospital visitor
 P. S. Mithran as Xerox Shop Owner (special appearance)
 Sharath Ravi as Mobile shop owner
 Aranthangi Nisha as Rathi's patient
 Rishikanth as Kesavan 
 Nithin Prasanna in an uncredited role

Production 
Vishal decided to fund and act in a venture directed by newcomer P. S. Mithran in August 2016, and subsequently signed on actress Samantha to play the leading female role in the film. The team signed Arya to play the antagonist in October 2016, with the actor accepting terms without hearing the film's entire script. Subsequently, music composer Yuvan Shankar Raja, cinematographer George C. Williams and editor Ruben were added to the project. Designers NJ Sathya and Neeraja Kona also were revealed to be in charge of the costumes of the lead actors for the film.

The film began production following a launch event in October 2016, with Vishal and Samantha shooting scenes alongside actors Robo Shankar and Delhi Ganesh for the first schedule. Arya later opted out of the film citing that he was not ready to play an antagonist in Tamil cinema, and subsequently the team brought in Arjun.
Before getting Arjun on board, Mithran was in talks to get S. J. Surya and Fahadh Faasil the role, but Surya chose Mersal and Fahadh chose Velaikkaran.

Music 

The soundtrack and background score features music by Yuvan Shankar Raja. The songs were performed by relatively new singers. The album received positive reviews. IndiaGlitz, in its review, noted, "The album is a definite marker of Yuvan's expertise with Athiradi, Yaar Ivan and Azhage. Playlist worthy" Behindwoods in its review said "Irumbu Thirai album is mix of melodies and theme based songs that will work better with visuals"

Release 
The film was dubbed and released into Hindi as The Return of Abhimanyu and was dubbed in Malayalam under the same name.  The satellite rights of the film's Tamil and Malayalam version were sold to Zee Tamil and Mazhavil Manorama while the digital rights were sold to ZEE5 and the dubbed versions were sold to Sun NXT and ManoramaMAX respectively.

Box office
Tamil Nadu theatrical rights of the film were sold for 24.5 crore. The film grossed  at the worldwide box office and became a commercial success.

References

External links 

2018 action thriller films
2010s Tamil-language films
2018 films
Indian action thriller films
Techno-thriller films